Papyrus 62 (in the Gregory-Aland numbering), signed by 𝔓62, known also as ‘‘Papyrus Osloensis’’, is a copy of the New Testament and Septuagint in Greek-Coptic. It is a papyrus manuscript of the Gospel of Matthew and Book of Daniel. The manuscript palaeographically has been assigned to the 4th century.

Description 

The surviving text of Matthew are verses 11:25-30, they are in a fragmentary condition. It contains also fragments of Book of Daniel 3:51-53 and Odae (Papyrus 994 Rahlfs). Survived fragments of 13 leaves.

The text is written in one column per page, 7 lines per column, 7-12 letters in line.

 Greek
Matthew 11:25; 11:25; 11:25-26; 11:27; 11:27; 11:27-28; 11:28-29; 11:29-30; 11:30.
 Coptic
Matthew 11:25-29.

The nomina sacra are written in an abbreviated way (θς, ις, κε, πρ, πηρ, υς).

It has diaeresis over letter ypsilon.

Greek text of Matthew 

The Greek text of the Gospel of Matthew is a representative of the Alexandrian text-type. Aland placed it in Category II.

In Matthew 11:25 it reads εκρυψας along with Codex Sinaiticus, Vaticanus, Bezae, minuscule 33, lectionary 2211. Other manuscripts read απεκρυψας (C, L, W, Θ f1, f13, Byz).

The text of Daniel represents Theodotion's recension.

History 

Leiv Amundsen dated the manuscript to the 4th century. INTF dated it to the 4th century.

The manuscript was found in Egypt.

The text was published by Amundsen in 1945. It was examined by Maldfeld, Kurt Treu, Karl Jaroš.

It is cited in critical editions of the New Testament (NA26, NA27).

It is currently housed at the University of Oslo Library (Inv. 1661) in Oslo.

Image gallery

See also 

 Daniel 3
 List of New Testament papyri
 Matthew 11

References

Further reading 

 Leiv Amundsen, Christian Papyri from the Oslo Collection, Symbolae Osloenses 24 (Oslo: 1945), pp. 121–147.

External links 

 Images of Papyrus 62
 LDAB

New Testament papyri
4th-century biblical manuscripts
Coptic New Testament manuscripts
Septuagint manuscripts
Gospel of Matthew papyri